Bishan is one of the districts of Chongqing, China, with a history of over 2000 years. Formerly a county, it became a district on 6 June 2014.

Administrative divisions
Bishan administers 2 subdistricts, 10 towns and 1 township and, with a total area of 915 square kilometers.

History

Bishan has a recorded history of over 2000 years.
In 316 BC, Jiangzhou County was established here by the State of Qin.
In 757, Bishan County was established and administered by Yuzhou.
In 1102, Bishan was administered by Gongzhou, which is renamed from Yuzhou.
In 1189, Gongzhou was promoted to Chongqing Fu, which still administered Bishan County.
In 1259, Bishan County was merged into Ba County.
In 1483, Bishan County was re-established.
In 1662, Bishan County was merged into Yongchuan County.
In 1729, Bishan County was re-established again.
In 1914, Bishan County was administered by Sichuan province.
In 1997, Bishan County became part of the newly established Chongqing Municipality.
In 2014, Bishan County became Bishan District of Chongqing.

Geographic condition
Bishan is located in 106°02′E−106°20′E of longitude and 29°17′N−29°53′N of latitude. It is in border with Shapingba District and Jiulongpo District in east, with Jiangjin District of Chongqing in south, with Tongliang County and Yongchuan District of Chongqing in west, with Hechuan District and Beibei District of Chongqing in north.

Climate
Its climate belongs to subtropic monsoon weather style, with an annual average temperature of 18.0℃, annual total rainfall of 1231.2mm and frost-free period of 337 days.

Transportation

Bus

Metro
The Bishan metro station of Line 1 (Chongqing Rail Transit) opened on December 30, 2019. The Bishan rubber-tyred tram runs between the Bishan metro station and Bishan high-speed rail station.

Railway
Construction of the Bishan Railway Station began in 2012 and is estimated to be completed by late 2014. It will be on the route of the Chengdu–Chongqing Intercity Railway. The railway is scheduled to open for passenger service by June 2015. The railway station will act as a central travel hub for the Bishan area. Once the high-speed line is completed, Bishan will be further integrated into the urban area of Chongqing, as travel time to Chonqing city proper will be reduced to a mere 15 minutes.

Notes

External links
Government website of Bishan (in Simplified Chinese)

Districts of Chongqing